The 2000 NCAA Division II football season, part of college football in the United States organized by the National Collegiate Athletic Association at the Division II level, began on September 2, 2000, and concluded with the NCAA Division II Football Championship on December 9, 2000 at Braly Municipal Stadium in Florence, Alabama, hosted by the University of North Alabama. The Delta State Statesmen defeated the Bloomsburg Huskies, 63–34, to win their first Division II national title.

The Harlon Hill Trophy was awarded to Dusty Bonner, quarterback from Valdosta State.

Conferences and program changes

Conference standings

Conference summaries

Postseason

The 2000 NCAA Division II Football Championship playoffs were the 27th single-elimination tournament to determine the national champion of men's NCAA Division II college football. The championship game was held at Braly Municipal Stadium in Florence, Alabama for the 14th time.

Playoff bracket

See also
 2000 NCAA Division I-A football season
 2000 NCAA Division I-AA football season
 2000 NCAA Division III football season
 2000 NAIA football season

References